Merkel Independent School District is a public school district based in Merkel, Texas (USA). The district covers portions of two counties, Taylor and Jones.

In addition to Merkel, the district also serves the city of Tye. Their mascot is the Badger. Their UIL conference affiliation is 3A.

The district changed to a four day school week in fall 2022.

Schools
Merkel High School(Grades 9–12)
Merkel Junior High (Grades 7–8)
Merkel Elementary (Grades Pre-K-6)

References

External links
 Merkel ISD

School districts in Jones County, Texas
School districts in Taylor County, Texas
School districts in Abilene, Texas